Akmal Saburov (born 22 October 1987) is a Tajikistani footballer who plays for Vakhsh Qurghonteppa and the Tajikistan national football team .

Career

Club
In June 2012, Saburov moved from FC Istiklol to Regar-TadAZ.

In March 2017, Saburov was registered by Tajik League side Vakhsh Qurghonteppa for their upcoming season.

Career statistics

International

Statistics accurate as of match played 15 November 2011

Personal life
In July 2010, Saburov and his wife had a baby daughter.

Honours
 Vakhsh Qurghonteppa
 Tajik League (1): 2009
 Istiklol
 Tajik League (1): 2011
 Regar-TadAZ
 Tajik Cup (1): 2012

References

External links
 

1987 births
Living people
Tajikistani footballers
Tajikistan international footballers
Footballers at the 2006 Asian Games
Association football midfielders
Asian Games competitors for Tajikistan
Tajikistan Higher League players
FC Istiklol players